Roberto Luiz Justus (born 30 April 1955) is a Brazilian investor, businessman and television personality.

Biography and career
Justus was born in São Paulo, Brazil, to a Jewish Hungarian immigrant family. He is best known for O Aprendiz, broadcast by Record, which is the Brazilian version of The Apprentice (TV series). He married  Ticiane Pinheiro who is the daughter of Helô Pinheiro, a Brazilian socialite. The couple, who divorced in 2013, have one daughter, Rafaella. He hosts the TV show Um Contra Cem on SBT and Roberto Justus + on Record.

Justus considered running for the presidency of Brazil in the 2018 elections, but eventually abandoned the idea.

References

External links

 Quem é Roberto Justus? (Who is Roberto Justus?), Terra.com.br

1955 births
Living people
People from São Paulo
English-language singers from Brazil
Brazilian people of Hungarian-Jewish descent
Brazilian businesspeople
Brazilian television personalities